Tseyen-Oidovyn Davaatseren (born 19 March 1971) is a Mongolian former boxer. He competed in the men's bantamweight event at the 1996 Summer Olympics.

References

1971 births
Living people
Mongolian male boxers
Olympic boxers of Mongolia
Boxers at the 1996 Summer Olympics
Boxers at the 1994 Asian Games
Boxers at the 1998 Asian Games
Asian Games competitors for Mongolia
Bantamweight boxers
20th-century Mongolian people
21st-century Mongolian people